Timothy Michael Wynn (born May 5, 1970) is an American musical composer for films, television shows, and video games. His co-score for Warhawk was recognized as one of the best video game scores for 2007 by IGN and the International Film Music Critics Association.

Biography
Wynn began his music training as a founding member of the prestigious Orange County High School of the Performing Arts in 1988. From there he was accepted into the Thornton School of Music at the University of Southern California, where he studied under Elmer Bernstein, Christopher Young, Buddy Baker and Jerry Goldsmith.

Wynn started his professional career writing the score for Last Chance. While working on the film, he met aspiring music supervisor Alex Patsavas. The two would continue working on the films, including The Prophet and Recoil. In 2000, Wynn worked on a documentary for Steven Spielberg, to be used for the opening of the United States Holocaust Memorial Museum in Washington, DC. After the documentary, he went on to score other documentaries including D-Day, Moments of Truth, and Filmscapes.

In 2002, Wynn scored the ABC television series The Chair. He also composed music for the ABC television series Thieves and Joel Silver's The Strip. In 2003, he was tapped to score the feature film, Descendant. His next project was the acclaimed Warner Brothers documentary, James Dean: Forever Young, narrated by Martin Sheen. He then switched gears and scored the comedy Partners, in 2005. In 2007, Wynn wrote the music for the international television series ODYSSEY: Driving Around the World and the American television series Supernatural. In 2009, he worked on the ABC television series The Deep End.

Wynn began writing music for video games in 2005, starting with The Punisher. In 2007, he teamed up with longtime partner Christopher Lennertz to write the score for Warhawk, which was nominated for Score of the Year by the International Film Music Critics and was chosen one of the best scores of 2007 by IGN. Wynn's next project was scoring The Simpsons Game which later received a Game Audio Network Guild (G.A.N.G.) award for Best Arrangement of a Non-Original Score. He then went on to produce tracks for Gun. In 2008, he scored the award-winning franchise Command & Conquer: Red Alert 3. In 2009, he scored Command & Conquer: Red Alert 3 – Uprising and Red Faction Guerrilla). In 2010, Wynn composed the score for Command & Conquer 4: Tiberian Twilight.

He was also as part of a collaboration between several of the biggest names of Hollywood composers entitled, "A Symphony of Hope", which benefited victims of the 2010 Haiti earthquake.

Credits

Films

1990s

2000s

2010s

Television
The Strip (1999)
Thieves (2001)
The Chair (2002)
Supernatural (2005–present)
The Deep End (2010)
Tokyo Control (2011)
Lucky Seven (2012)
Wolfpack of Reseda (TV series) (2012)
Tokyo Airport Air Traffic Services Department (TV Mini-Series) (2012)
Atelier (2015)
Mech-X4 (2016–2018)

Video games
The Punisher (2005)
Gun (2005)
The Simpsons Game (2007) (Additional music with Christopher Lennertz, score composed by Hans Zimmer and James Dooley)
Command & Conquer: Red Alert 3 (2008)
Command & Conquer: Red Alert 3 - Uprising (2009)
Red Faction Guerrilla (2009)
Command & Conquer 4: Tiberian Twilight (2010)
Dungeon Siege III (2011)
The Darkness II (2012)
Madden NFL 25 (2013) (with Christopher Lennertz)
Total War Battles: Kingdom (2015)
Total War: Atilla (2015)
XCOM 2 (2016)
Total War: Warhammer (2016)
XCOM 2: War of the Chosen (2017)
Total War: Warhammer II (2017)
Total War Saga: Thrones of Britannia (2018)
Total War: Three Kingdoms (2019)
Total War Saga: Troy (2020)
Marvel's Midnight Suns (2022)

References

External links

Sources 
http://www.music4games.net/Features_Display.aspx?id=279 Archived from the original 2008/07/02
https://www.webcitation.org/67fNUmatQ?url=http://music.ign.com/articles/831/831403p1.html Archived    
http://filmmusiccritics.org/awards-archive/2007-ifmca-awards/ Archived 
https://www.webcitation.org/67fNZp3Lf?url=http://music.ign.com/articles/843/843573p1.html 
http://www.audiogang.org/index.php?option=com_content&task=view&id=159&Itemid=188 
http://www.vgmrush.com/artist.php?id=67
http://www.odysseyshow.com/
http://www.originalsoundversion.com/osvostoty-2012-winner-for-best-in-game-soundtrack-is/#more-18941

1970 births
Living people
American film score composers
American male film score composers
American television composers
Video game composers
USC Thornton School of Music alumni